Falconina is a genus of corinnid sac spiders first described by Paolo Brignoli in 1985.

Species
 it contains four species:
Falconina albomaculosa (Schmidt, 1971) – Ecuador
Falconina crassipalpis (Chickering, 1937) – Panama, Cuba
Falconina gracilis (Keyserling, 1891) – Brazil, Paraguay, Argentina. Introduced to USA
Falconina melloi (Schenkel, 1953) (type) – Colombia, Venezuela

References

External links
Falconina at BugGuide

Araneomorphae genera
Corinnidae
Spiders of Central America
Spiders of South America
Spiders of the Caribbean
Taxa named by Paolo Brignoli